P. mirabilis  may refer to:
 Pisaura mirabilis, a spider species
 Proteus mirabilis, a Gram-negative, facultatively anaerobic bacterium species

See also
 Mirabilis (disambiguation)